Dina Brawer (born Dina Elmaleh) is an Orthodox woman rabbi and the founder of the Jewish Orthodox Feminist Alliance division in the United Kingdom (JOFA UK). Brawer received her rabbinical ordination at Yeshivat Maharat in the United States and is the first Orthodox woman rabbi to serve in the UK. Brawer's work at JOFA UK focuses on women's rights in Orthodox Judaism and the religious education of adult women in Orthodox communities in the UK.

Background 
Brawer was born and raised in Milan, Italy to a Chabad Hasidic family. After migrating to the United Kingdom, Brawer's education included a B.A. in Hebrew and Jewish Studies from the University of London, an M.A. in Education and Psychology from the Institute of Education, London. In 2013, Brawer established and led JOFA UK to advocate for expanding the religious roles of women in Britain's Orthodox communities. Subsequently, Brawer joined Yeshivat Maharat and received her ordination in 2018. Brawer is not formally affiliated with the Chabad Hasidic community but has described her education and training in Chabad as fundamental to her approach to Judaism. Brawer is married to Rabbi Dr. Naftali Brawer who was born in Boston but raised in Canada. Brawer and her husband co-founded of the Mishkan community in London which is described as a "transdenominational, pop-up Jewish community". After years of service in Britain's Jewish community, the Brawers relocated to the United States.

Recognition
Dina Brawer was listed among Britain's 100 most influential Jewish community activists in 2016.

See also
 Sara Hurwitz
 Shira Marili Mirvis
 Timeline of women rabbis

References

External links 
 

Orthodox Judaism in the United Kingdom
Rabbis from London
British women's rights activists
People from Milan
Orthodox women rabbis
Orthodox Jewish feminists
Year of birth missing (living people)
Living people